Wayne Cohen is a songwriter, producer, artist developer, and music educator whose songs include Top 10 hit singles and #1 albums, which have sold more than 5 million, in the U.S., UK, Europe, Australia/New Zealand and Asia. He works from his NYC studio Stand Up Sound, as well as in London and Los Angeles.

Discography

Artist Developer 

In addition to his many released songs, Wayne is known within the music industry to have made significant contributions to the development of the careers of multi-million selling Clive Davis-signed blue-eyed soul artist Curtis Stigers, singer/songwriter Martin Sexton, singer/songwriter Michelle Lewis, Australian indie pop/rock artist Dimitra, UK artists Thousand Hours, Laura Welsh (Laura and the Tears) and US artist Karen Kanan.

Business Ventures 

Wayne owns Stand Up Sound/Stand Up Songs/Wayne’s World (ASCAP), a NYC-based music and audio production company, recording studio  (see citation), and independent music publishing company. His company runs a robust internship program, which has hosted many student interns from the US and the UK. He also has co-publishing ventures with Sony Music Publishing.

Educator 

In addition to his three decades of real-world experience, Wayne has taught Melody Writing, Lyric Writing, Music Production and Music Marketing at university-level institutions including the State University of NY at Purchase College, New York University (the Clive Davis Institute of Recorded Music, Tisch and Steinhardt divisions) and at Berklee College of Music. He has also developed a song tutoring (see citation) course that benefits songwriters around the world, in person, and via Skype.

Early life 

Before becoming a songwriter, Wayne was a music creative director, composer and producer for visual media. He started his career at age 21 as the youngest music and radio producer in the history of ad agency Young & Rubicam, followed by a long stint with major NYC based advertising music production company HEA Productions. His advertising accomplishments include composing and producing music and audio for international television/radio ad campaigns for advertisers including Coca-Cola, Burger King, Amtrak, U.S. Army, and Dr. Pepper. Prior to his work in advertising Wayne earned his Independent Learning - jazz studies B.A. from Indiana University, and performed across the US and in the UK in jazz and rock bands.

References

External links 

Sitti "Dream Enough" video
Laura and the Tears "Love Live On" video

American male songwriters
Record producers from New York (state)
Musicians from New York City
Living people
Date of birth missing (living people)
Year of birth missing (living people)